The nickname pancake engine has been applied to several types of internal combustion engine, including:

 Avro Canada VZ-9 Avrocar jet engine
 Detroit Diesel Series 71 (horizontal version)
 Electro-Motive Diesel#EMD 'pancake' diesels 16-184 and 16-338 engines
 Nordberg Manufacturing Company radial diesel engine
 Volkswagen air-cooled engine